Bony Mountain is a rural locality in the Southern Downs Region, Queensland, Australia.

History 
The locality was named after mountain which was named after bones of horses found in the vicinity, possibly from runaways from Toolburra station or from horses that died from the drought in 1900.

Bony Mountain Provisional School opened on 18 February 1902. On 1 January 1909 it became Bony Mountain State School. It closed on 30 March 1972. It was in the northern part of 20 Bony Mountain Road.

References 

Southern Downs Region
Localities in Queensland